Boy Meets Girl is the debut album by American pop singer-songwriters George Merrill and Shannon Rubicam, also known as Boy Meets Girl.  It was released on A&M Records in 1985, and was their only disc for the label.  The album included the band's first top 40 hit on the Billboard pop chart, when "Oh Girl" peaked at No. 39.

The album was written by Rubicam and Merrill, with one outside writer receiving co-credit on one track. The music is much different from their later work as it has a more prominent hard rock influence. Merrill and Rubicam would go on to pen hits for Whitney Houston and get a contract with RCA Records, which would release their second full-length album, Reel Life, three years later.  That record would provide them with their sole top-ten hit as a recording act, "Waiting for a Star to Fall."

Track listing
All songs written by Shannon Rubicam and George Merrill (Irving Music/Boy Meets Girl Music), except where noted.

"Oh Girl" - 4:18
"Don't Tell Me We Have Nothing" - 4:01
"The Touch" (Rubicam, Merrill, T. Bell; Irving Music/Boy Meets Girl Music/BellBoy Music) - 3:55
"Kissing, Falling, Flying" - 3:34 
"From Now On" - 4:49
"Be My Baby" - 3:47
"In Your Eyes" - 4:09
"I Wish You Were Here" - 3:37
"Pieces" - 4:09
"Premonitions" - 4:47

Personnel

Boy Meets Girl 
 Shannon Rubicam – lead and backing vocals
 George Merrill – lead and backing vocals, MIDI piano, Roland Jupiter-8, Yamaha DX7, Oberheim DMX programming

Additional musicians 
 Richard Gibbs – E-mu Emulator, vocoder
 John Goux – lead guitar (1), guitar (1, 4, 9)
 Scott Shelly – guitar (1, 5, 7)
 John Morton – guitar (2, 5, 9, 10)
 Paul Jackson, Jr. – guitar (3, 6, 8)
 Eric Williams – guitar (4)
 Leon Gaer – bass (1-6, 8, 9, 10)
 Kyle Henderson – bass (7), backing vocals (8)
 Michael Jochum – drums
 Steve Forman – percussion
 Tom Werman – percussion
 Gary Herbig – tenor saxophone (6)
 George Hawkins – backing vocals (2, 10)
 Thom Bell – backing vocals (3, 6)
 Jon Joyce – backing vocals (4, 7)
 John Batdorf – backing vocals (7)
 Susan Boyd – backing vocals (9)

Production 
 Tom Werman – producer 
 Gary Ladinsky – recording, mixing
 Matt Brady – recording assistant 
 George Marino – mastering 
 Richard Frankel – art direction 
 Michael Hodgson – art direction, design 
 Norman Seeff – photography 

Studios
 Recorded at Record Plant and Sounder Studios (Los Angeles, California).
 Mastered at Sterling Sound (New York City, New York).

Notes 

1985 debut albums
Boy Meets Girl (band) albums
A&M Records albums
Albums produced by Tom Werman